Lewis Run is a borough in McKean County, Pennsylvania, United States. The population was 578 at the 2020 census.

Demographics

As of the census of 2000, there were 577 people, 259 households, and 178 families residing in the borough. The population density was 297.7 people per square mile (114.8/km2). There were 287 housing units at an average density of 148.1 per square mile (57.1/km2). The racial makeup of the borough was 98.61% White, 0.17% African American, 0.52% Native American, 0.17% Asian, 0.17% from other races, and 0.35% from two or more races. Hispanic or Latino of any race were 0.17% of the population.

There were 259 households, out of which 25.9% had children under the age of 18 living with them, 57.1% were married couples living together, 6.9% had a female householder with no husband present, and 30.9% were non-families. 28.2% of all households were made up of individuals, and 14.3% had someone living alone who was 65 years of age or older. The average household size was 2.23 and the average family size was 2.70.

In the borough the population was spread out, with 19.4% under the age of 18, 6.6% from 18 to 24, 27.0% from 25 to 44, 23.2% from 45 to 64, and 23.7% who were 65 years of age or older. The median age was 43 years. For every 100 females there were 96.9 males. For every 100 females age 18 and over, there were 92.1 males.

The median income for a household in the borough was $35,221, and the median income for a family was $41,719. Males had a median income of $31,042 versus $23,750 for females. The per capita income for the borough was $21,670. About 3.8% of families and 6.5% of the population were below the poverty line, including 8.1% of those under age 18 and 7.5% of those age 65 or over.

Geography
Lewis Run is located at  (41.870101, -78.662201).

Climate
According to the Köppen Climate Classification system, Lewis Run has a humid continental climate, abbreviated "Dfb" on climate maps.

References

Populated places established in 1911
Boroughs in McKean County, Pennsylvania